Antoinette Perry,  (born 1953 or 1954) is a Canadian former schoolteacher and the 29th lieutenant governor of Prince Edward Island since 2017, acting as the province's viceregal representative of King Charles III of Canada. She was appointed on September 14, 2017, by Governor General David Johnston on the constitutional advice of Prime Minister Justin Trudeau, and was sworn in on October 20, 2017, succeeding H. Frank Lewis. Perry's swearing in ceremony took place in Tignish, Prince Edward Island, marking the first time a PEI lieutenant governor was sworn in outside of the province's capital, Charlottetown.

Perry is an Acadian who taught as a schoolteacher for 32 years after attaining a bachelor's degree in music education at the Université de Moncton in 1976, and has also served as the church organist at St. Simon & St. Jude Church in Tignish. Perry, who is single, is the first unmarried lieutenant governor of Prince Edward Island.

Arms

References

1950s births
Canadian schoolteachers
Canadian organists
Lieutenant Governors of Prince Edward Island
People from Tignish, Prince Edward Island
Living people
21st-century Canadian politicians
Canadian women viceroys
Women organists
21st-century organists
21st-century women musicians
21st-century Canadian women politicians